The 2010-2011 ABA season was the tenth season of the American Basketball Association that lasted from November 5, 2010, the finish of the regular season in late February, and the championship series at the end of March 2011. The Southeast Texas Mavericks ended up defending their league championship from 2009, winning their second straight championship by defeating the Gulf Coast Flash 2–0.

Over sixty teams plan were originally scheduled to compete during the 2010–11 season.  However, much of that list included teams that had no plans to start the season and teams which disappeared before the season began.

The league also planned to host over 800 games among the teams combined during the season.

Regular season

November
The regular season started on November 5, 2010, with the expansion team St. Louis Pioneers on the road to defeat the Chicago Steam, 93–73. The next day, they did it again, winning over the Steam, 91–81 on November 6.

The Tri-State Showcase took place from November 12–14 between nine teams in Dallas, Texas. The teams featured were the Dallas Impact, North Dallas Vandals, North Texas Fresh, Texas Rim Rockers, Texas Fuel, West Texas Whirlwinds, Oklahoma Stallions, Houston Red Storm, and Colorado Kings. The nine teams played a total of thirteen games in the three days. It was held at the Lakewest Family YMCA, home of the Impact.

A big announcement was made on November 13 when the league announced five more expansion teams to form a division in Canada in the 2011 season. Franchises would be put in five regions: Oshawa, Toronto, Mississauga, Hamilton and Northwest Ontario.  The Canadian teams, however, disappeared from listings in Summer 2011 and were replaced by a team ABA-Canada, which failed to start in the 2011–2012 season.

The Canadian Division was not the only announced 2011 expansion franchises. Before and during the first month of the ABA regular season, league offices reported new teams starting up in Richmond, Norfolk, Flint, Little Rock, Atlanta, Lynchburg (Virginia), among others.

On November 23, it was announced that the 2011 ABA All-Star Game would be held in Jacksonville, Florida, at Jacksonville Veterans Memorial Arena.

December
On December 2, the defending champion Southeast Texas Mavericks improved to 5–0 with an 84-point beatdown of Texas Fuel, 147–63. Nine players scored in double figures and Currye Todd scored a game-high 22 points. The Southeast Texas Mavericks, after recently extending their regular season game winning streak to twenty, were later defeated on the road against the Gulf Coast Flash by two points on December 21, falling to 9–1.

In late December, Marlo Saunders of the West Texas Whirlwinds surpassed 1,000 points scored and 500 rebounds in his short two-year career in the ABA, joining teammates Ray Williams and Charncy Ephriam as the only Whirlwinds to accomplish the feat.

February
The 2011 ABA All-Star Game resulted in a 123-122 Eastern conference win over the West, in front of a crowd of 4,488 at the Jacksonville Veterans Memorial Arena in Jacksonville, Florida. Kayode Ayeni, a forward from the Jersey Express, was rewarded with the game's Most Valuable Player award after scoring a game-high 25 points.

Playoffs
After the ABA All-Star Game, the playoffs started.  All teams still playing were eligible to enter.  Jacksonville Giants and Southeast Texas Mustangs were given byes to the final rounds, to be played at home of the Mustangs. Other teams were given byes to later rounds, based on season performance. The Gulf Coast Flash won the Eastern Conference title over the East Kentucky Energy, and the Mustangs beat the Giants to win the Western. The last four teams played in a double-elimination tournament. The Mustangs beat the Flash 2-0 and won the title for the second time.

League Standings

From USBasket.com

References

American Basketball Association (2000–present) seasons
ABA